Conal O'Brien (born July 18, 1956) has worked as an American television director for nearly 30 years, and is a graduate of Carnegie Mellon University. He is the author of Birth of the Angel: The COVID Murders Mystery: Book One of Two published in February, 2021. And, Death of Television: The COVID Murders Mystery: Book Two of Two published in November, 2022.

His father, Vince O'Brien, appeared in several soap operas, in addition to roles in films, such as Annie Hall, as well as playing the "Shell Answer Man".

Positions held
All My Children
 Director (1987-2010)
 Fight Director (1984-1990)
 Director/Producer two short films: The Secret,  Quiet
 Guest Director:  One Life To Life

The Young and the Restless
 Director: December 9, 2010-2017

Awards and nominations
Daytime Emmy Award
Nomination, 1990–1994, 1996–2002, 2005, Directing, All My Children
Win, 1995 & 2003, Directing, All My Children

Directors Guild of America Award
Nomination, 2004, Directing, All My Children, (episode #8768)
Nomination, 2000, Directing, All My Children, (episode #7969)
Nomination, 2005, Directing, All My Children

References

External links

conalobrien.com

American television directors
Living people
1956 births
People from Haworth, New Jersey
American television writers
All My Children
The Young and the Restless